Robin Biddulph was an Australian swimmer who specialized in freestyle. He was the Australian national swimming champion, an Australian and New South Wales record holder and a bronze medalist in the British Empire Games in 1938.

See also
 List of Commonwealth Games medallists in swimming (men)

References

Swimmers at the 1938 British Empire Games
Commonwealth Games medallists in swimming
Commonwealth Games bronze medallists for Australia
Australian male freestyle swimmers
Medallists at the 1938 British Empire Games